Ann Jones defeated the three-time defending champion Billie Jean King in the final, 3–6, 6–3, 6–2 to win the ladies' singles tennis title at the 1969 Wimbledon Championships. It was her first Wimbledon title, and her third and last Grand Slam singles title overall.

Seeds

  Margaret Court (semifinals)
  Billie Jean King (final)
  Virginia Wade (third round)
  Ann Jones (champion)
  Nancy Richey (quarterfinals)
  Kerry Melville (second round)
  Julie Heldman (quarterfinals)
  Judy Tegart (quarterfinals)

Qualifying

Draw

Finals

Top half

Section 1

Section 2

Section 3

Section 4

Bottom half

Section 5

Section 6

Section 7

Section 8

References

External links

1969 Wimbledon Championships – Women's draws and results at the International Tennis Federation

Women's Singles
Wimbledon Championship by year – Women's singles
Wimbledon Championships
Wimbledon Championships